Christianity is a minority in Jiangxi, the province of China where Taoism is from. There are numerous Christians in Fuzhou, which is the capital of Jiangxi. A Jiangxi Bible School exists. In the 17th century, Catholic missionary Jean Basset was active in Jiangxi and other parts of China.
Jiangxi has persecution of Christians. Bishop Zheng Jingmu was arrested in 2000.

Roman Catholic dioceses with seat in Jiangxi 

Roman Catholic Diocese of Ganzhou
Roman Catholic Archdiocese of Nanchang
Roman Catholic Diocese of Ji’an
Roman Catholic Diocese of Nancheng
Roman Catholic Diocese of Yujiang

See also 
 Spirit Church
 Christianity in Jiangxi's neighbouring provinces
 Christianity in Anhui
 Christianity in Fujian
 Christianity in Guangdong
 Christianity in Hunan
 Christianity in Zhejiang

References 

Religion in Jiangxi
Christianity in China by location